James "Jim" Robert Burke (born November 29, 1961 in Sacramento, California) is an American author who resides in San Francisco, California. He teaches English at Burlingame High School.

Writings 

Burke has written over a dozen books on the art of teaching, including The Teacher's Daybook, Tools for Thought, Reading Reminders, and Illuminating Texts, all published by Heinemann, as well as The Reader's Handbook, published by Great Source.

Award 

Burke is the recipient of National Council of Teachers of English's 2000 Exemplary English Leadership Award.

Affiliations 

Burke was inducted into the California Reading Association's Hall of Fame, and he currently serves on the Adolescence and Young Adulthood/English Language Arts Standards Committee of the National Board for Professional Teaching Standards.

Sources 

 Burke, Jim. The English Teacher's Companion (2nd edition) Heinemann: Portsmouth, N.H. (2003)

1961 births
American education writers
American educators
Living people
People from Burlingame, California
Writers from Sacramento, California